Acobamba or Aqupampa (Quechua aqu sand, pampa large plain, "sand plain") is a district in the middle of Tarma Province in Peru. It is bordered by districts of Tarma, La Unión  and Palcamayo on the west, Huasahuasi District on the north, districts of Palca and Tapo on the east, and  districts of Tapo and Tarma on the south.

See also 
 Rumi Pukyu
 Wayunkayuq
 Yana Urqu

External links
  Official municipal website
  Tarma Tour (Archived 2009-10-24)